Michael Joyce O'Neill (5 October 1877 – 12 August 1959) was a starting pitcher and left fielder in Major League Baseball. From 1901 through 1907, he played for the St. Louis Cardinals (1901–04) and Cincinnati Reds (1907). O'Neill batted and threw right-handed. A native of Maam, Ireland, he played as Michael Joyce in his 1901 rookie year with the Cardinals.

Birth
He was born in the village of Maum, in County Galway, Ireland, to Michael O'Neill, a landholder, and Mary Joyce.

Career
O'Neill was a good-hitting pitcher who occasionally played in the left field. In 1901, he ended with a 2–2 record and a 1.32 earned run average, including a shutout, and hit .400 (6-for-15). His most productive season came in 1902, when he posted an 18–12 record with two shutouts, a 2.75 ERA, and two saves. On June 3, he was rested until being summoned as a pinch hitter in the ninth inning with the bases loaded. O'Neill responded by hitting the first pinch grand slam in major league history off Togie Pittinger of the Boston Beaneaters. It was an inside-the-park home run as O'Neill became the first National League pitcher to hit a grand slam in the 20th century.

Despite his 3.26 ERA in 1903, O'Neill had a 4-13 record, in part due to poor run support, as he posted a WHIP of 1.56. He went 10-14 with a 2.09 ERA in 1904 and did not return with St. Louis the next year. He also played with the Cincinnati Reds in 1907, strictly as a reserve left fielder and pinch-hitter, retiring from baseball at the end of the season. In a four-season pitching career, O'Neill posted a 32–44 record with 228 strikeouts and a 2.73 ERA in 694.1 innings. He completed 68 games in 77 starts. In five seasons, he was a .255 hitter with two home runs and 41 RBI in 137 games played (85 as a pitcher).

O'Neill died in Scranton, Pennsylvania at the age of 81.

MLB Record

Pitching Record
Note: G = Games pitched; IP = Innings pitched; W = Wins; L = Losses; ERA = Earned run average; SO = Strikeouts

Batting Record
Note: G = Games played; AB = At bats; H = Hits; Avg. = Batting average; HR = Home runs; RBI = Runs batted in

Head coaching record

Family
O'Neill was one of four brothers who played in the major leagues:
Jack (1873–1975), a catcher for the St. Louis Cardinals, Chicago Cubs and Boston Braves (1902–1906), who also caught Mike's first start for St. Louis (April 4, 1902)
Steve (1891–1962), who caught for the Cleveland Indians, Boston Red Sox, New York Yankees and St. Louis Browns (1911–1928), and later managed the Cleveland Indians, Detroit Tigers, Boston Red Sox, and Philadelphia Phillies (1935–1954)
Jim (1893–1976), a shortstop for the Washington Senators (1920, 1923)

See also

List of players from Ireland in Major League Baseball

References

External links

Encyclopedia of Baseball Catchers

19th-century Irish people
20th-century Irish people
1877 births
1959 deaths
Irish emigrants to the United States (before 1923)
Sportspeople from County Galway
Cincinnati Reds players
St. Louis Cardinals players
Philadelphia Phillies scouts
Major League Baseball left fielders
Major League Baseball pitchers
Major League Baseball players from Ireland
Irish baseball players
Baseball players from Pennsylvania
Minor league baseball managers
Scranton Miners players
Montreal Royals players
York Penn Parks players
Harrisburg Senators players
Elmira Colonels players
Utica Utes players
Syracuse Stars (minor league baseball) players
Shreveport Gassers players
Plattsburgh (baseball) players